Myrtle House is an Elim Pentecostal Church in Llanelli, Wales.  The church was started in 1935 as a result of the actions of P.S. Brewster.

History

20th Century

P.S. Brewster preached in the town, and the preaching had a dramatic effect, and so the church was born. At first the sermons were held in the local ballroom but over the year two sites in the town became available, and both were used, the first being Llanelli, Carmel in Charles Street and the second Siloam in Ann Street. Two pastors were appointed, Walter Urch and Gerald Ladlow.

21st Century

In Easter 2000 the church moved to a permanent location, which is Myrtle House.  The move saw an immediate boom in the congregation. Before the move the church had about 40 people, but a week after the move this number increased to 70, and in 2006 there was a congregation of 200.

References

External links
 Official site
 Facebook Page
 An article about the church in the revival times
 History of the Church
 Church location
 Elim Pentecostal Church - The Elim movements official Web Site

Elim Pentecostal Church